The Kensington Social Library is an historic building located at 126 Amesbury Road (New Hampshire Route 150) in Kensington, New Hampshire. The building, constructed in 1895, was listed on the National Register of Historic Places in 2020.

See also
National Register of Historic Places listings in Rockingham County, New Hampshire

References

External website

Libraries on the National Register of Historic Places in New Hampshire
Buildings and structures completed in 1895
Buildings and structures in Rockingham County, New Hampshire
Libraries in New Hampshire
1895 establishments in New Hampshire
National Register of Historic Places in Rockingham County, New Hampshire
Kensington, New Hampshire